Samshvilde (also Շամշուլդա, Shamshulda) is a village in the Tetritsqaro Municipality, Kvemo Kartli, Georgia. It is located 4 km south of the town of Tetritsqaro and 2 km north of the ruins of the medieval town of Samshvilde. The village was founded by a group of Armenians in the early 19th century and named after the nearby historical locale.

The environs of the village, on the middle Khrami River, are a protected area as the Samshvilde Canyon Natural Monument.

Population 
As of the 2014 national census, Samshvilde had the population of 443, mostly (98%) ethnic Armenians.

References 

Populated places in Tetritsqaro Municipality